The Violet Quill (or the Violet Quill Club) was a group of seven gay male writers that met in 1980 and 1981 in New York City to read from their writings to each other and to critique them.  This group and the writers epitomize the years between the Stonewall Riots and the beginning of the AIDS pandemic.

Importance
What made this group important was that several of its members became some of the most important Post-Stonewall gay writers in America, and the group includes writers and works that have been linked to gay writing as a literary movement. Edmund White and Andrew Holleran in particular stand out.

Members
The seven writers are: 
 Christopher Cox (1949—1990)
 Robert Ferro (1941—1988)
 Michael Grumley (1942—1988)
 Andrew Holleran (b. 1944)
 Felice Picano (b. 1944) 
 Edmund White (b. 1940)
 George Whitmore (1946—1989)

Between 1988 and 1990, AIDS claimed the lives of four of these men.

History
Felice Picano recalls that the group started because straight editors, agents, and fellow writers weren't being helpful with advice on gay themed writing.

Gay fiction before the Violet Quill was of four classes. The first two were primarily or ostensibly for straight audiences where the gay characters are either minor to the main theme, or in which they live tragic lives and then died. The third was those of high literary vales and were therefore valued by critics. The fourth was gay pornography.

The AIDS sea change not only resulted in the death of many members of the gay community, but forever changed gay literature, including gay fiction.

Selected works by the members of The Violet Quill
 Christopher Cox - A Key West Companion (1983)
 Robert Ferro - The Family of Max Desir (1983)
 Michael Grumley - After Midnight (1978)
 Andrew Holleran - Dancer from the Dance (1978)
 Felice Picano - An Asian Minor (1981)
 Edmund White - A Boy's Own Story (1982)
 George Whitmore - The Confessions of Danny Slocum (1980)

References

Gay male literature
LGBT organizations in the United States
1980 establishments in the United States